Classy Creek is a tributary of the Tuya River in northwest part of the province of British Columbia, Canada.

Classy Creek's watershed's land cover is classified as 46.8% shrubland, 23.3% mixed forest, 20.3% conifer forest, and small amounts of other cover.

Classy Creek is in the traditional territory of the Tahltan people.

Geography
The creek flows first southwest then south through Level Mountain's high and relatively barren lava plateau. The Indian reserve "Classy Creek 8", of the Tahltan First Nation, is located about halfway along the creek's course where it turns south, just south of Mincho Lake. Near its mouth Classy Creek descends into the canyon of the Tuya River.

See also
List of British Columbia rivers

References 

Cassiar Land District
Level Mountain
Nahlin Plateau
Rivers of British Columbia
Stikine Country
Tahltan